Barú District is a district (distrito) of Chiriquí Province in Panama. The population according to the 2000 census was 60,551. The district covers a total area of 589 km². The capital lies at the city of Puerto Armuelles.

Administrative divisions
Barú District is divided administratively into the following corregimientos:

Puerto Tomás Armuelles (capital)
Limones
Progreso
Baco
Rodolfo Aguilar Delgado

Economics 
In 2001, a free zone area was approved called Zona Franca de Barú it aims to promote tourism and other businesses. In 2010, a special economic zone was also created.

References

Districts of Panama
Chiriquí Province